Dětřichov nad Bystřicí is a municipality and village in Bruntál District in the Moravian-Silesian Region of the Czech Republic. It has about 400 inhabitants.

Administrative parts
The village of Krahulčí is an administrative part of Dětřichov nad Bystřicí.

History
The first written mention of Dětřichov nad Bystřicí is from 1317.

Until 1918, Dittersdorf was part of the Austrian monarchy (Austria side after the compromise of 1867), in the Sternberg (Šternberk) district, one of the 34 Bezirkshauptmannschaften in Moravia.

In 1938, after the Munich Agreement, it was annexed by Nazi Germany and administered as a part of Reichsgau Sudetenland. The German speaking population was expelled in 1945 according to the Beneš decrees and replaced by Czech settlers.

References

External links

Villages in Bruntál District